The Dumping Ground Survival Files is a fifteen-part CBBC miniseries featuring various Dumping Ground characters, giving information on how to survive in The Dumping Ground. The show was made to accompany Series 2 of The Dumping Ground, it shows archive footage from Tracy Beaker Returns and interviews with characters.

Due to the COVID-19 pandemic, The Dumping Ground had to have a transmission break, and therefore, a third series of The Dumping Ground Survival Files was commissioned, with filming being done remotely and on the set of The Dumping Ground. Series 3 began on 6 November 2020 and aired during the transmission break of Series 8.

Episodes

Series 1 (2014)

Series 2 (2014)

Series 3 (2020)

References

External links
 

2010s British children's television series
2014 British television series debuts
2014 British television series endings
BBC children's television shows
The Story of Tracy Beaker
The Dumping Ground
Tracy Beaker series
Television series by BBC Studios